The Men's Combined competition in the 2016 FIS Alpine Skiing World Cup involved three events that combined a one-run speed race  (downhill (generally referred to as a "super-combined") or Super-G (generally referred to as an "Alpine combined")) with a one-run slalom.  Under the rules in effect at the time, three races in the discipline were required to award a crystal globe to the discipline champion (and, in a change, fewer than three races might still be sufficient, after no crystal globes were handed out in the discipline for the three previous seasons).  The declining popularity of combined skiing (reflected in the small number of events the past three years) led the three combined races scheduled for 2016 to be run under three different formats.  The first race, at Wengen, was run as a traditional super-combined (downhill followed by slalom); the second race, at Kitzbühel, was run as a traditional Alpine combined (Super-G followed by slalom); and the third race, at Chamonix, was run as an inverted super-combined (slalom followed by downhill).

Alexis Pinturault of France had been co-champion in two (2013-14) of the previous three seasons where too few races had been held for the discipline champion to be awarded a crystal globe and runner-up (by 14 points) in the other (2015).. However, with three races back on the schedule in 2016, Pintaurault won the last two of them to claim the crystal globe for the season.

At this time, combined races were not included in the season finals, which were scheduled in 2016 in St. Moritz, Switzerland.

Standings

DNS = Did Not Start
DNS2 = Finished run 1; Did Not Start run 2
DNF1 = Did Not Finish run 1
DNF2 = Did Not Finish run 2

See also
 2016 Alpine Skiing World Cup – Men's summary rankings
 2016 Alpine Skiing World Cup – Men's Overall
 2016 Alpine Skiing World Cup – Men's Downhill
 2016 Alpine Skiing World Cup – Men's Super-G
 2016 Alpine Skiing World Cup – Men's Giant Slalom
 2016 Alpine Skiing World Cup – Men's Slalom

References

External links
 Alpine Skiing at FIS website

Men's Combined
FIS Alpine Ski World Cup men's combined discipline titles